Enjil may refer to:
Enjil, Afghanistan
Injil District, a district in Herat Province, Afghanistan
Enjil, Morocco